Anthony Athanas (July 28, 1911 – May 20, 2005) was a multi-millionaire Albanian American restaurateur and philanthropist. His restaurants included Anthony's Pier 4, known throughout United States. In 1976 the National Restaurant Association named him Restaurateur of the Year.

Life 
Born in Korçë, southern Albania, then part of the Manastir Vilayet of the Ottoman Empire, on July 28, 1911, Athanas and his mother Evangeline traveled on a donkey to a port and emigrated to Bedford, New York in 1915–16, where his father, who was a mason, and siblings had settled. At the age of thirteen Athanas left school and worked in several restaurants until 1938, when he bought his first restaurant: Anthony's Hawthorne Café in Lynn, Massachusetts, which by the early 1950s had become the highest-grossing restaurant in Massachusetts, with profits of more than $1 million annually. The Lynn restaurant closed in 2008. In 1963, he opened Anthony's Pier 4, which by the early 1980s was grossing about $12 million annually and was the highest-grossing restaurant in the United States, though it closed in August 2013. His other restaurants included the Hawthorne by-the-sea Tavern and The General Glover House in Swampscott, Massachusetts (The General Glover House closed in the late 1990s), and Anthony's Cummaquid Inn in Yarmouth Port. Cummaquid Inn closed in 2016.  Hawthorne-By-The-Sea Tavern in Swampscott, MA is the only remaining of his restaurants.  

Athanas had also served as president of Massachusetts's Restaurant Association, a member of the board of the National Restaurant Association, while in 1976 he was named "Restaurateur of the Year". In 1999 during the Kosovo War, he became a member of the congressional delegation of the United States, Albania, Kosovo, and Macedonia. Although Athanas had no formal education he was a popular lecturer at Harvard Business School, the University of New Hampshire and Cornell University, and was awarded the "Horatio Alger Award" by the Horatio Alger Association of Distinguished Americans in 1978. He died at his Swampscott home on May 20, 2005, of Alzheimer's disease at the age of 93. The funeral was held at St. George Albanian Orthodox Cathedral in South Boston.

References 

1911 births
2005 deaths
People from Korçë
People from Manastir vilayet
Albanian emigrants to the United States
People from Swampscott, Massachusetts
American restaurateurs
Deaths from Alzheimer's disease
Neurological disease deaths in Massachusetts
American people of Albanian descent